The  was a class of minelayers of the Imperial Japanese Navy (IJN), serving during and after World War II. Nine vessels were planned under the Maru Sen Programme; however only one vessel was completed by the end of war.

Background
By the end of 1944, Japanese sea lanes were cut apart by United States Navy. The IJN focused on securing the Sea of Japan. Therefore, the IJN had to lay naval mines in La Pérouse Strait, Tsugaru Strait, and Tsushima Strait. However, the IJN had already lost all of its minelayers. The IJN planned to build two kinds of minelayers. One was the large Minoo class; the other was the smaller Kamishima class.

Design
The Navy Technical Department (Kampon) revised the Hirashima's drawings, and gave it the armaments intended for escort ships (or kaibōkan).  Their Type 5 40 mm AA was the latest anti-aircraft gun in the Imperial Japanese Army and Navy. It was a Japanese version of the Bofors 40 mm.

Ships in class

Footnotes

Bibliography
, History of Pacific War Vol.51, The truth histories of the Imperial Japanese Vessels Part.2, Gakken (Japan), June 2002, 
Ships of the World special issue Vol.45, Escort Vessels of the Imperial Japanese Navy, (Japan), February 1996
The Maru Special, Japanese Naval Vessels No.47, Japanese naval mine warfare crafts,  (Japan), January 1981
Daiji Katagiri, Ship Name Chronicles of the Imperial Japanese Navy Combined Fleet, Kōjinsha (Japan), June 1988,